Iakora District is a district in south-eastern Madagascar. It is a part of Ihorombe Region and borders the districts of Ihosy to the northwest, Ivohibe to the northeast, Midongy Sud to the east, Befotaka to the south and Betroka to the west.

Communes
The district is further divided into five communes:

 Andranombao
 Begogo
 Iakora
 Ranotsara Nord
 Volambita

References

Districts of Ihorombe